Chionodes pereyra is a moth in the family Gelechiidae. It is found in North America, where it has been recorded from Massachusetts and Michigan to Florida and Texas.

The larvae feed on Quercus species of the red oak group.

References

Chionodes
Moths described in 1947
Moths of North America